Antonio Medina may refer to:

 Antonio Medina y Céspedes (1824-1885), Afro-Cuban poet and playwright
 Antonio Medina Comas (born c. 1969), executive director of the Puerto Rico Industrial Development Company
 Antonio Medina García (1919–2003), Spanish chess master
 Antonio Medina (footballer) (born 1984), Argentine footballer

See also
 José Antonio Medina (born 1996), Mexican footballer